Eser is both a Turkish surname and a Turkish given name. Notable people with the name include:

Given name
 Eser Afacan (born 1953), artist, painter and sculptor
 Eser Yağmur (born 1983), Turkish footballer

Surname
 Albin Eser, (born 1935), German judge
 Ruprecht Eser (1943-2022), German journalist
 Sertan Eser (born 1974), Turkish footballer

Turkish-language surnames
Turkish unisex given names